Lakeshore Area Regional Recovery of Indiana, or LARRI, is a non-profit, faith-based, business, public, and other community partner group that acts as a long-term recovery committee. LARRI served the survivors of the flooding of September 13–15, 2008, who have effortlessly utilized their resources from insurance, FEMA, savings, and other sources in the restoration of their residences.

Structure of the organization
On November 17, 2008, members from a then newly formed steering committee made up of non-profit, faith-based, business, public and other community partners came together to form a long-term recovery committee. This organization was formed to help serve the survivors from the September 13–15, 2008 flooding who had exhausted their resources from insurance, FEMA, savings and other sources in the restoration of their homes.

The organization named itself Lakeshore Area Regional Recovery of Indiana, or LARRI. Reverend Steven Conger, senior pastor of Ridge United Methodist Church in Munster, worked to bring representatives of different faiths together from Lake, Porter and LaPorte counties to develop a long-term strategy to address those residents' needs.

The group was formed, according to Conger, because of the challenges many people faced after the September 2008 flood. According to Conger, many residents in Lake, Porter and LaPorte counties were unprepared for the disaster, and LARRI was formed not only to help those whose lives were devastated by the flooding, but also to help prevent the chaos from occurring again.

LARRI had set up several subcommittees and worked on everything from communication to financial resource development. It secured funds through donations and planned fundraisers and searched for grants and funding.

In June 2009, LARRI named Jane Delligatti of Porter, Ind. was named its director. Delligatti brought more than 20 years of experience in planning and implementing successful programs and workplace strategies when she came to the organization. Delligatti’s  previous experience includeded director of marketing for Arnell Auto Group in Burns Harbor; owner of Millennium Marketing and Advertising Chesterton and prepress manager at the Post-Tribune in Merrillville.

Progress
On February 10, 2010, after LARRI workers and other volunteers successfully rebuilt the DeMars' family home, a house blessing was organized to welcome home the DeMars family of Munster. The home was nearly destroyed by the devastating September 2008 flood, but about 16 months after the flooding took place, Sherry DeMars was back home. The family moved into their new three-bedroom house in late January 2010 with their 13-year-old golden retriever, Benny. Construction labor was donated, and Home Depot provided building materials at a substantial cost savings. Faith-based groups volunteering included the Brethren Disaster Ministries and the Amish/Mennonite Men of Nappanee. Ten Americorps volunteers, ages 18 to 24, worked on the home, as did teams from Habitat for Humanity, University of Chicago chapter. At the blessing, everyone in attendance joined hands while LARRI President Rev. Steve Conger delivered the prayer for the ceremony.

On March 29, 2010, LARRI team members and volunteers once again rebuilt a home for a victim of the September 2008 flood to welcome Carollyn Lewis of South Haven home. Lewis suffered extensive damage to her home from the flood, and her crawl space filled with water and came up into the main floor enough to destroy the floor from underneath. Dangerous black mold had crept all the way to the second story inside the walls and was making her ill. During this time period, Lewis lost her job. When all seemed lost, she was approved for home restoration assistance from LARRI. Lewis moved out of her home in June so work could begin, and the entire downstairs and part of the upstairs was gutted and restored through the efforts of LARRI. Several volunteer groups that had a hand in restoring Lewis’s home included The Brethren Disaster Ministries, The United Way, United Methodist Church of Valparaiso and One Brick of Chicago. As is now tradition at all LARRI welcome home ceremonies, LARRI team members and volunteers joined hands around the Lewis house to signify the many people it took to fix the home, while LARRI President Steve Conger gave the blessing.

On June 16, 2010, the LARRI organization held its third house blessing for a LARRI client. Diane Glittenberg and her mother Donna's home was demolished due to the flooding in Dyer, and both had to live with family members. After she was told about LARRI by her pastor from Dyer Methodist Church and LARRI board member Ken Puent, Glittenberg filed for assistance from the organization, making the Glittenberg's one of the first families LARRI helped. Almost two and a half years later, Glittenberg and her mother were finally able to move back into a new safe and secure home that was made to accommodate Glittenberg's disabled mother. At the house blessing, about 40 people -ranging from family and friends to LARRI construction workers, office members and volunteers - came out to support the Glittenberg family and to finally welcome them home.

Grants

Lilly Endowment, Inc.

Lilly Endowment Inc. is headquartered in Indianapolis, Indiana, and is one of the world's largest private philanthropic foundations and is among the ten largest such endowments in the United States.

The endowment was founded in 1937 by J. K. Lilly Sr. and his sons Eli and J. K. Jr., with gifts of stock in the pharmaceutical company Eli Lilly and Company. While stock in the company is the Endowment's foremost asset, the Endowment is separate from the company. The Endowment, a private foundation, is in a different location, has a different board of directors, and is not linked to the company, except for the significant percentage of the company's stock it holds. The foundation has historically had three primary areas of grantmaking: community development, education and religion. Lilly Endowment is unique in that it is the largest private foundation in the United States that funds almost exclusively in its home city and state.

LARRI is funded through a grant from Lilly Endowment, Inc. to assist people from the Northwest Indiana region who were effected by the September 2008 flood.

Partners and supporters

United Way

United Way of America, based in Alexandria, Virginia, is a non-profit organization that works with nearly 1,300 local United Way offices throughout the country in a coalition of charitable organizations to pool efforts in fundraising and support. The focus of United Way is identifying and resolving pressing community issues, as well as making measurable changes in the communities through partnerships with schools, government agencies, businesses, organized labor, financial institutions, community development corporations, voluntary and neighborhood associations, the faith community, and others. The issues United Way offices focus on are determined locally because of the diversity of the communities served. However, the main focus areas include Education, Income and Health.

At the beginning of LARRI's formation, the Indiana  Association of United Ways was instrumental in helping the organization obtain a grant from Lilly Endowment, Inc.

American Red Cross

The American Red Cross (also known as the American National Red Cross) is a humanitarian organization that provides emergency assistance, disaster relief and education inside the United States. It is the designated U.S. affiliate of the  International Federation of Red Cross and Red Crescent Societies.

Today, in addition to domestic disaster relief, the American Red Cross offers services in five other areas: community services that help the needy; communications services and comfort for military members and their family members; the collection, processing and distribution of blood and blood products; educational programs on preparedness, health, and safety; and international relief and development programs.

The American Red Cross has continuously lent its support to LARRI since its inception, and continues to help LARRI by sitting on its steering committee.

AmeriCorps

National Civilian Community Corps (NCCC), or AmeriCorps NCCC is an AmeriCorps program that engages 18- to 24-year-olds in team-based national and community service in the United States. National Civilian Community Corps teams complete about four different six- to eight-week-long projects during their 10-month term of service. Corps Members and Team Leaders are representative of all colors, creeds, states, and economic status. Approximately 1,200 Corps Member and Team Leaders are chosen annually to serve at one of five regional campuses, located in Sacramento, California; Denver, Colorado; Vinton, Iowa; Vicksburg, Mississippi; and Perry Point, Maryland. Each campus serves as a training center and hub for a multi-state region. Members are required to complete a minimum of 1,700 hours of service, including 80 independent service hours, though members complete an average of 1,850 service hours per term.

AmeriCorps NCCC has worked with LARRI almost since its creation, and has been involved in many home rebuilds since 2006. Recently, LARRI welcomed its fifth AmeriCorps NCCC team to the Northwest Indiana region.

The Salvation Army

The Salvation Army is an evangelical Christian church known for charitable work. It is an international movement that currently works in 121 countries. It has its International Headquarters (IHQ) at 101 Queen Victoria Street, London, England.
The Salvation Army's stated mission is to perform evangelical, social and charitable work and bring the Christian message to the poor, destitute and hungry by meeting both their physical and spiritual needs. The organization claims that its ministry extends to all, regardless of age, gender, colour or creed.

Its stated objectives are:
The advancement of the Christian religion as promulgated in the religious doctrines—which are professed, believed and taught by the Army and, pursuant there to, the advancement of education, the relief of poverty, and other charitable objects beneficial to society or the community of mankind as a whole.

The Salvation Army has continuously lent its support to LARRI since its inception, and continues to help LARRI by sitting on its steering committee

Home Depot

The Home Depot is an American retailer of home improvement and construction products and services. The Home Depot operates 2,193 big-box format stores across the United States (including all 50 U.S. states, the District of Columbia, Puerto Rico, the Virgin Islands and Guam), Canada (all ten provinces), Mexico and China. The Home Depot is headquartered from the Atlanta Store Support Center in unincorporated Cobb County, Georgia.

In terms of overall revenue reported to the U.S. Securities and Exchange Commission, The Home Depot is the largest home improvement retailer in the United States, ahead of rival Lowes, and the fourth largest general retailer.

In November 2009, four Northwest Indiana Home Depot stores partnered with LARRI to help with flood cleanup and restoration projects. On November 12, 2009 volunteers from all four stores came out to give their time with to help restore the homes of several September 2008 flood victims.

The RoomPlace
The RoomPlace has been serving the Chicago area since 1912. Until 1985, The RoomPlace operated as a single store in Chicago. Today it is headquartered in Lombard, Ill., operates 22 stores in the Chicago area, including three showrooms in metro Chicago; 14 in suburban Chicago; and single showrooms in Rockford, Ill., and Merrillville and Mishawaka, Ind. According to its Mission Statement, "The RoomPlace is committed to creating for its customers a shopping experience unlike any other furniture retailer, while continuing to offer the service, selection, and value that has made The RoomPlace a success since 1912."

In the summer of 2009, The RoomPlace partnered with LARRI to help replace damaged or lost furniture to people who were affected by the September 2008 flood. The RoomPlace offers a specific selection of sofas, chairs, dinette sets and bedroom suites at discounted prices that LARRI representatives can purchase for clients.

Christian Reformed World Relief Committee
"The Christian Reformed World Relief Committee (CRWRC) is the relief and development arm of the Christian Reformed Church. CRWRC reaches out in God's name to people, both in North America and around the world, who are struggling with poverty, hunger, disaster, and injustice to help them find lasting ways to improve their lives.

One aspect of this ministry is community development.  In this ministry CRWRC's staff members engage in community transformation in 30 countries around the world.  They partner with more than 130 churches and community organizations to train local people to be leaders in their own communities.  Together, CRWRC and these partners help people work together to overcome illiteracy, hunger, malnutrition, unemployment, HIV/AIDS, child mortality, injustice, and other issues affecting them.

Another aspect of CRWRC's ministry is disaster response and relief.  When disasters strike, CRWRC responds to the urgent needs that arise.  In North America, this often includes clearing debris, assessing needs, training local leaders, and repairing and reuiblding damaged homes.  Internationally, it includes providing and distributing emergency food, water, shelter, and other supplies.  It also often involves reconstruction of homes and livelihoods.

The third aspect of CRWRC's ministry involves working with people in North America and around the world to connect them to ministry, deepen their understanding of global issues, and encourage them to act and advocate on behalf of those in need.

CRWRC does not receive ministry shares and depends on the regular financial support of God’s people."

The CRWRC has helped LARRI by volunteering to restore homes for families who have been affected by the September 2008 flooding in Northwest Indiana.

Church of the Brethren Disaster Ministries

The Church of the Brethren represents the largest body descending from Mack's Schwarzenau Brethren church. suffered a major division in the early 1880s, creating the three wings: traditionalists such as the Old German Baptist Brethren, progressives led by The Brethren Church, and the original majority known as conservatives later adopting the name "Church of the Brethren" in 1908. The latter body had 124,408 members as of June 2009 and 1,035 congregations in the United States and Puerto Rico as of April 2010.

The Church of the Brethren Disaster Ministries has volunteered with LARRI many times, offering its service to help people affected by the September 2008 floods. Brethren teams rotate in and out of Northwest Indiana weekly while volunteering with LARRI, a system the Brethren has had in place since working with the organization.

Geminus
Geminus Corporation is a management group that offers innovative concepts...providing comprehensive support services, human resources, communications, purchasing, accounting, finance, client billing, and management information systems, for behavioral health care providers and human service organizations.

The non-for-profit Geminus provides these services for the Regional Mental Health Center throughout Lake County, Indiana; Geminus Head Start for Lake and Porter Counties.

Geminus has been a strong supporter of LARRI since its creation, providing assistance to families who have been affected by the September 2008 flood. Geminus

References

Natural disasters in Indiana
Non-profit organizations based in Indiana